KISS Symphony: The DVD is a DVD by the American hard rock band KISS. The DVD features footage from the Australian tour, and the audio had been released for the live album Kiss Symphony: Alive IV.

Track listing
All tracks were recorded at Etihad Stadium (formerly known as Telstra Dome) in Melbourne, Australia, on February 28, 2003.

2-Disc Edition

Disc 1

Disc 2

Certifications

References

External links
 KISS Online

Kiss (band) video albums
2003 video albums
Live video albums
2003 live albums